The 1975 New South Wales Rugby Football League premiership was the 68th season of Sydney's professional rugby league football competition, Australia's first. Twelve teams, including six of 1908's foundation clubs and another six from across Sydney competed for the J. J. Giltinan Shield during the season, which culminated in a grand final match for the WD & HO Wills Cup between the Eastern Suburbs and St. George clubs. NSWRFL teams also competed for the 1975 Amco Cup.

Season summary
The season saw the introduction of differential penalties for scrum offences. Each side faced each other twice in twenty-two regular season rounds from March to August, resulting in a top five of Eastern Suburbs, Manly-Warringah, St. George, Canterbury-Bankstown and Parramatta who battled it out for the premiership over six finals matches. With three sides finishing in equal fifth place, two elimination finals playoffs also had to be played.

Western Suburbs had 1 point deducted for fielding an ineligible player in round 8. After losing two consecutive matches in rounds 2 and 3, defending premiers Eastern Suburbs posted nineteen consecutive wins to close out the regular season; a streak than ran from round 4 to round 22 and remained the record for the most consecutive wins in premiership history until Melbourne Storm equalled the record in 2021; Round 3 to Round 23, although they were later eliminated by eventual Premiers Penrith Panthers in the preliminary final.

The 1975 season's Rothmans Medallist was Cronulla-Sutherland centre Steve Rogers. Rugby League Week gave their player of the year award to Manly-Warringah back Bob Fulton.

Teams

Regular season

Bold – Home game
X – Bye
Opponent for round listed above margin

Ladder

Western Suburbs were stripped of 1 competition point due to an illegal replacement in one game.

Ladder progression

Numbers highlighted in green indicate that the team finished the round inside the top 5.
Numbers highlighted in blue indicates the team finished first on the ladder in that round.
Numbers highlighted in red indicates the team finished last place on the ladder in that round.

Finals
Balmain, Parramatta and Western Suburbs tied for fifth place, necessitating a play-off drawn from a hat.

Chart

Grand final

This was the first grand final to be telecast in colour.
The star-studded Eastern Suburbs line up had lost only 2 matches in the 22-game regular season and were clear starting favourites. However, St. George looked a chance early on when utility back "Lord Ted" Goodwin put on a chip and chase. Goodwin collided with Eastern Suburbs' fullback Ian Schubert, came off second best and was out of touch for the remainder of the match. Things were also wrong with captain-coach Graeme Langlands who was struggling with his coordination following an ill-directed pain killing injection that numbed his right leg and severely affected his form.

At half-time, Eastern Suburbs were up 5–0. Just after the break the Roosters' prop Ian McKay crashed over from close range and the floodgates opened. Eastern Suburbs unleashed a torrent of tries with Johnny Mayes, Arthur Beetson, John Brass, Bruce Pickett and boom recruit Schubert all scoring.

Despite his numbed leg, Langlands returned in the second half hoping it would come good. It didn't and he was replaced. By the end of the game, St. George had been completely demoralised by Easts in a 38–0 record Grand final defeat. Fellow Immortal and peer Australian Captain Arthur Beetson attempted in vain to console the forlorn Langlands at match end.

Easts' eight tries in the grand final matched South Sydney's record achievement in the 1951 final (subsequently equalled again by Manly in 2008).

Eastern Suburbs 38Tries: Brass (2), Mayes (2), McKay, Beetson, Pickett, SchubertGoals: Peard (7)

St George 0

Player statistics
The following statistics are as of the conclusion of Round 22.

Top 5 point scorers

Top 5 try scorers

Top 5 goal scorers

References

New South Wales Rugby League premiership
NSWRFL season